Blessed be may refer to
 A modern Pagan or Wiccan blessing
Blessed Be, a 2000 album by The 69 Eyes

See also
Fivefold kiss